Bruno Lebrun (born 24 December 1956) is a French weightlifter. He competed in the men's bantamweight event at the 1980 Summer Olympics.

References

1956 births
Living people
French male weightlifters
Olympic weightlifters of France
Weightlifters at the 1980 Summer Olympics
People from Houilles